Swami Haridas (1480—1573) was a spiritual poet and classical musician. Credited with a large body of devotional compositions, especially in the Dhrupad style, he is also the founder of the Haridasi school of mysticism, still found today in North India. His work influenced both the classical music and the Bhakti movements of North India, especially those devoted to Krishna's consort Radha. Hit Harivansh Mahaprabhu, Hariram Vyas, Rupa Goswami, Vidyapati, Mahaprabhu Vallabhacharya, Vitthalnath (Gusainji), were his contemporaries.

Swami Haridas is a direct disciple of father of Carnatic Music Purandara Dasa of Karnataka.

He had many pupils, Tansen being one of them and one of Akbar's nine gems.

Biography
Haridas's father was a Saraswat Brahmin from Multan and that his mother's name was Chitra Mata. The family migrated to a village called Rajpur , near Vrindavan in Uttar Pradesh. Haridas was born there in 1480 and the village is now called Rajpur gram in his honor. This village holds that he died in 1575. He was disciple of Shri Ashudheer Maharaj, also his father who followed the Nimbarka Sampradaya, he is said to be the Avatar of Shri Lalita Sakhi. He was deeply learned and widely acquainted with the music of his time. Mention is found in his works of stringed instruments such as the kinnari and aghouti and of drums such as the mridang and daff. He mentions the ragas of Kedar, Gauri (raga), Malhar and Basant. Swami Haridas is said to have been the teacher of Tansen, one of the nine gems of Akbar's court, and the renowned dhrupad singer and composer Baiju.

He later shifted his residence to Vrindavan, the playground of the immortal cowherd Krishna and Radha. There he built his ashram (hermitage) in Nidhivan and sang his songs of the love of Radha-Krishna. Following the example of Swami Shribhatta, Haridas continued to praise the Lord until the Lord manifested himself as Sri Banke Bihari. Swami Haridas' spiritual disciples included Vitthal and Krishna Das who fostered his tradition of devotional music. Groups (samaj,  like the sankeertan of Bengal and the bhajana goshti of South India) of devotees came together and sang of the Lord of Vrindavan.

His samadhi (tomb) is in Nidhivan, Vrindavan.

Songs of Swami Haridas
Haridas's compositions may be classed as Vishnupadas. Even his prabandhas that do not refer to Krishna have come to be known as Vishnupadas, perhaps because of the mystic source of his music but also because they are musically constructed in a manner similar to dhrupads. He is also said to have written tirvats, ragamalas and other forms. There are around 128 compositions attributed to him, of which eighteen are philosophical (siddhanta pada) and a hundred and ten devotional (keli mala).

He describes Radha and Krishna's sporting:

Two beams of light are playing -
Unique their dance and music.
Ragas and raginis of heavenly beauty are born,
The two have sunk themselves in the ocean of raga.

Swami Haridas belonged to the tradition of madhura bhakti - Adoration expressed in conjugal imagery.

Haridas's theology embraces not merely the Love of Krishna and Radha but also the witnessing of the Love, a state of mind called rasa. In an ecstatic condition of trance he sings of the play of Krishna among the bowers of Vrindavan. More than Krishna, Radha was the central personality of all his poems.

He says:

Who knows of the quality of things more than Radha?
If anyone has any knowledge at all, it is by her grace.
None knows the beauty of raga, tala and dance as Radha does.

Popular culture
An annual classical music festival, Swami Haridas Sangeet Sammelan is held every year in Mumbai since 1952.

See also
 Music of India
 Hindustani classical music
 Achintya Bheda Abheda
Nidhivan, Vrindavan

References

External links

Bankey Bhihari Temple, Vrindavan
Bankey Bhihari Temple Website
Postage stamp on Swami Haridas

People from Mathura
People from Aligarh
Performers of Hindu music
Indian Hindus
Indian male classical musicians
Bhakti movement
1478 births
1573 deaths
16th-century Indian musicians